Al Gorgoni (born 1939) is an American guitarist, composer, arranger, and producer, known for his work as a studio musician during the 1960s and 1970s.

Biography
Growing up in Philadelphia, his family moved to The Bronx where he took up the guitar at age 14.

His first recording sessions took place in 1959, playing on demo recordings with Brill Building songwriters Barry Mann, Cynthia Weil, Carole King, Gerry Goffin, and Phil Spector. Gorgoni eventually moved into proper sessions, appearing on hit singles such as "The Name Game" by Shirley Ellis, "Sherry," "Walk Like A Man" and "Big Girls Don't Cry" by The Four Seasons, "Leader of the Pack" by The Shangri-Las, and "Chapel of Love" by The Dixie Cups. Other hits featuring Gorgoni's playing are "The Sound of Silence" by Simon & Garfunkel, "Brown Eyed Girl" by Van Morrison, "I'm a Believer" by The Monkees, "At Seventeen" by Janis Ian, "Sugar, Sugar" by The Archies, and "Brand New Key" by Melanie.

Gorgoni worked with many other artists including Joan Baez, Blood Sweat & Tears, Bobby Darin, Neil Diamond, Bob Dylan, Richard and Mimi Fariña, Aretha Franklin, Marvin Gaye and Tammi Terrell, Astrud Gilberto, Herbie Mann, Laura Nyro, James Taylor, and B.J. Thomas. This article contains only a partial list of credits.

Discography

With Herbie Mann 
 Our Mann Flute (Atlantic, 1966)
With Barry Mann 
 Lay It All Out (CBS Records, 1971)
 Barry Mann (Casablanca Records, 1980)
With Al Kooper 
 White Chocolate (Sony, 2008)
With Kai Winding
 The In Instrumentals (Verve, 1965)
With Simon & Garfunkel 
 Sounds of Silence (Columbia Records, 1966)
With Carole Bayer Sager 
 Carole Bayer Sager (Elektra Records, 1977)
With Janis Ian
 Janis Ian (Verve, 1967)
 Stars (Columbia Records, 1974)
 Aftertones (Columbia Records, 1975)
 Janis Ian (Columbia Records, 1978)
With B.J Thomas

 Billy Joe Thomas (1972)
 Rock'n'Roll Lullaby (1972)
 Songs (1973)
 Longhorn & London Bridges (1974)

Gorgoni, Martin and Taylor ( Buddah /Legacy, 1972)

References

1939 births
Living people
American session musicians
Songwriters from Pennsylvania
Songwriters from New York (state)
Record producers from Pennsylvania
Record producers from New York (state)
Guitarists from Philadelphia
American male guitarists
20th-century American guitarists
American rock guitarists
Guitarists from New York City
20th-century American male musicians
American male songwriters